Ouangolodougou (also known as Wangolodougou) is a town in the far north of Ivory Coast, adjacent to the border with Burkina Faso. It is a sub-prefecture of and the seat of Ouangolodougou Department in Tchologo Region, Savanes District. Ouangolodougou is also a commune. In 2021, the population of the sub-prefecture of Ouangolodougou was 82,801.

Ouangolodougou is situated in the sub-Saharan Sahel savanna biogeography region, which is characterised by grasslands with trees.

Transport
The town is served by a station on the Abidjan-Niger Railway.

Villages
The 14 villages of the sub-prefecture of Ouangolodougou and their population in 2014 are:

References 

Sub-prefectures of Tchologo
Communes of Tchologo